The Grove of Old Trees is a  open space reserve forest of mostly second growth coast redwood trees on a broad, flat ridgetop west of Occidental, California.

Location 
There are no signs on the roads leading to the grove or on the trails within the grove. Grove visitors may take Coleman Valley Road from Occidental town center to Joy Road, then turn right from Joy Road onto Fitzpatrick Lane. Cautious drivers on this single lane road will find a small turnout with a wooden archway on the right at about 17500 Fitzpatrick Lane. Parking space is very limited, and often fills up on weekends. LandPaths maintains a system of free, publicly accessible trails with some suitable for wheelchairs and strollers. There is a picnic table near the west end of the grove, but there are no bathroom facilities or trash containers. Dogs must be kept on a leash within the grove.

History 
Originally the area was part of the ancestral home of the Coast Miwok and Southern Pomo Indigenous peoples.

Following European colonization, the grove was owned by the Coleman and Van Alstyne families. Those families preserved a few old-growth forest trees for family gatherings while the surrounding forests were converted to lumber. 

In the 1990s, remnant old growth redwoods were slated to be cut down as part of a timber harvest plan. County residents launched a campaign to protect the grove. Subsequently, LandPaths purchased the grove in 2000 with the assistance of the Sonoma County Agricultural Preservation and Open Space District, the Save the Redwoods League, the California Coastal Conservancy, and private individuals.

Sonoma Ag and Open Space holds a Forever Wild conservation easement on the property, which mandates zero take of trees .

Ecology 
The grove is mostly second-growth redwoods with a tanoak understory and sword fern ground cover. The few surviving old-growth redwoods on this ridgetop location are smaller than those found on valley floors.

References 

Nature reserves in California